Langfjord Church is a parish church of the Church of Norway in Alta Municipality in Troms og Finnmark county, Norway. It is located in the village of Langfjordbotn. It is one of the churches for the Talvik parish which is part of the Alta prosti (deanery) in the Diocese of Nord-Hålogaland. The white, wooden church was built in a long church style in 1891 using plans drawn up by the architect Tygen. The church seats about 180 people.

History
The church was built in 1891 to serve the people of the Langfjordbotn area since it was a long journey to the main parish church. By 1904, the congregation had grown, so the nave was enlarged and lengthed to add about 25% more seating. The building was consecrated on 20 August 1891 by the Bishop Johannes Skaar. By the end of World War II, the church had been significantly looted and battered by the retreating German army which had used the building for their own purposes. The church was fixed up after the war. It wasn't until 1965, however, when the structural damage to the church was repaired.

Media gallery

See also
List of churches in Nord-Hålogaland

References

Alta, Norway
Churches in Finnmark
Wooden churches in Norway
19th-century Church of Norway church buildings
Churches completed in 1891
1891 establishments in Norway
Long churches in Norway